Naka-Kon is an annual three-day anime convention held during March at the Overland Park Convention Center and Sheraton Overland Park Hotel at the Convention Center in Overland Park, Kansas. The name of the convention comes from the Japanese word for "center/middle".

Programming
The convention typically offers an Artist Alley, contests, Dealers’ Room, game shows, fashion show, maid cafe, panels, showings, video game rooms, and workshops.

History
Naka-Kon was founded in 2005 by members of the University of Kansas Anime Club. The convention moved to the Overland Park Convention Center in 2012. Naka-Kon 2020 was cancelled due to the COVID-19 pandemic. Naka-Kon held a virtual convention in March 2021, a smaller event over Labor Day weekend in September, and in 2022 moved to Memorial Day weekend in May. The 2021 convention had an attendance cap of 2,500, with 2022 having a cap of 6,000.

Event history

References

External links
Naka-Kon Website

Anime conventions in the United States
Recurring events established in 2005
2005 establishments in Kansas
Annual events in Kansas
Festivals in Kansas
Culture of Overland Park, Kansas
Conventions in Kansas